Rick Noji (born October 22, 1967, in Seattle) is a retired American high jumper. He attended Franklin High School in Seattle, Washington and also attended the University of Washington.

He finished eighth at the 1991 World Championships. He also competed at the 1993 and 1995 World Championships without reaching the final.

His personal best jump is 2.31 metres, achieved in February 1992 in Long Beach.

Post-retirement

After retirement, Noji entered the private sector. He is currently employed in the data center industry and is on the leadership team at Green House Data.

References

1967 births
Living people
American male high jumpers
Track and field athletes from Seattle
Franklin High School (Seattle) alumni
University of Washington alumni